Donors Capital Fund is a nonprofit United States donor-advised charity that distributes grants to conservative and libertarian organizations. Donors Capital Fund is associated with Donors Trust, another donor-advised fund.

Background 

Donors Capital Fund is a 501(c)(3) nonprofit organization established in 1999. According to the organization, it was "formed to safeguard the charitable intent of donors who are dedicated to the ideals of limited government, personal responsibility, and free enterprise." Donors Capital Fund assures contributors that their donations will only support "a class of public charities firmly committed to liberty." Grants from Donors Capital Fund are based on the preferences of the original contributor.

Donors Capital Fund is associated with Donors Trust. Donors Trust refers clients to Donors Capital Fund if the client plans to maintain a balance of 1 million or more.

Board 
As of 2020, the board of directors of Donors Capital Fund includes:
 Lawson Bader
 Adam Meyerson of Philanthropy Roundtable
 Arthur C. Brooks of the American Enterprise Institute
 Kimberly Dennis of the Searle Freedom Trust
 Steven F. Hayward of the Ashbrook Center for Public Affairs 
 Kris Mauren of the Acton Institute
 Scott Bullock of the Institute for Justice
 Roger Ream of The Fund for American Studies

Grant-making activities 
According to The Guardian, Donors Trust and Donors Capital Fund distributed nearly 120 million to more than 100 groups skeptical of global warming between 2002 and 2010. According to a 2013 analysis by Drexel University environmental sociologist Robert Brulle, Donors Trust and Donors Capital Fund combined were the largest funders of what he calls "the climate change countermovement" in the US between 2003 and 2013. Brulle estimated that by 2009, approximately one-quarter of the funding of the "climate countermovement" came from Donors Trust and Donors Capital Fund.

In 2008, Donors Capital Fund granted 17.7 million to the Clarion Fund, now the Clarion Project, a nonprofit organization which "educates the U.S. public about the dangers of Islamic extremism".

Donors Capital Fund granted 192,000 to the Alaska Policy Forum (APF) in the organization's first two years, 2009 and 2010. APF is free-market think tank and a member of the State Policy Network (SPN) of conservative and libertarian think tanks which focus on state-level policy. The grants from Donors Capital Fund were most of the funds raised by APF in that period. In 2010, Donors Capital Fund granted 1.75 million to SPN, 2 million to Donors Trust, 2.5 million to the American Enterprise Institute, 2 million to Citizens Against Government Waste, 1.7 million to The Heartland Institute, and over 206 other grantees.

See also 
 Convention of States Project
 Democratic backsliding in the United States
 Leonard Leo
 Open the States & Convention of States Action
 The 85 Fund

References

External links 
 

Non-profit organizations based in Alexandria, Virginia
Organizations established in 1999
Conservative organizations in the United States
1999 establishments in the United States